Pseudoclanis kenyae is a moth of the  family Sphingidae. It is known from Sudan, Ethiopia, Somalia, Kenya, Uganda, Tanzania and Malawi.

The length of the forewings is about 45 mm for males. The forewing upperside is unicolorous light grey, with very obscure markings. There us only a single row of submarginal vein dots present. The basal dot is prominent. The forewing underside is light grey, but paler along the distal margin. There is a double row of submarginal vein dots present. The hindwing upperside is rich yellow and the hindwing underside is unicolorous light grey. There is a double row of submarginal vein dots present, these are prominent at the costal margin, but become fainter towards the anal angle.

References

Pseudoclanis
Moths described in 1928
Moths of Africa